The discography of hip hop recording artist Raleigh Ritchie comprises two studio albums, and four EPs. Signing with Columbia Records in 2013, he released his debut album in 2016.

Albums

Studio albums

Extended plays

Singles

Guest appearances

Music videos

References

Discographies of British artists